(stylized as【Oshi No Ko】) is a Japanese manga series written by Aka Akasaka and illustrated by Mengo Yokoyari. It has been serialized in Shueisha's Weekly Young Jump since April 2020, with its chapters collected in ten tankōbon volumes as of January 2023. An anime television series adaptation produced by Doga Kobo is set to premiere in April 2023.

Plot
Gynecologist Goro Amemiya is tasked with helping deliver the children of Ai Hoshino, a Japanese idol whom he admires, without the knowledge of the general public. However, the night of Ai's delivery, Amemiya is murdered by a mysterious man and is reincarnated as Aquamarine "Aqua" Hoshino, Ai's son, retaining his memories of his previous life. Aqua's fraternal twin, Ruby Hoshino, is also a reincarnation, though she refuses to admit her original identity as one of Goro's patients who got him interested in Ai in the first place.

Four years later, Ai is murdered by an obsessive fan that later commits suicide. However, Aqua pieces together that the fan must have had his and Ruby's father as an accomplice and thus resolves to enter the acting world to find and kill his father.

Twelve years later, Aqua joins various productions to get DNA samples to test against his own. He eventually meets his half-brother, Uehara Taiki, during a stage production, who tells Aqua that Taiki's parents committed a double suicide, but Aqua learns that their suicide happened before Ai's murder. Aqua's girlfriend, Akane Kurokawa, finds that the twins' actual father - Hikaru Kamiki - is alive, but Aqua cuts ties in an effort to protect her.

Meanwhile, Ruby starts an idol group under the same name as Ai's original group, joined by aspiring actress Kana Arima and Youtuber Mem-Cho. On an out-of-town MV shooting, Ruby finds Goro's corpse and runs into a mysterious child who confirms that her father was responsible for both Goro and Ai's murders. Fueled by revenge, Ruby throws herself into her idol career, propelling her solo and idol group's careers, though it ostracizes her from Aqua, Kana, and Mem-Cho.

Desperate to prove herself, Kana successfully establishes inroads with a famous director, but a tabloid captures her following the director back to his apartment and prepares to write an article suggesting that she's his mistress. To prevent this, Aqua leaks his and Ruby's identity as Ai's children, fracturing the twins' relationship.

Characters
 / 

Originally an obstetrician in his mid-twenties named , he was a big fan of Ai Hoshino and also responsible for delivering Ai's baby. He met his demise after Ai's stalker killed him and got reincarnated as the son of Ai himself. After his mother got killed by someone whom he suspected to be his unknown biological father, he swears to discover the truth behind the murder. He theorizes in the entertainment industry, which leads him into pursuing a career in acting to find him and avenge his mother.

Originally a terminally ill patient named Sarina Tendouji under the care of Gorou, she finds herself reincarnated along with her twin-brother, Aquamarine, as the daughter of Ai Hoshino. Before her reincarnation, Sarina obsessed over idols and dreamed to become one. A few years after being reincarnated, Ai is murdered. After Ai's death, Ruby trains to be an idol like her mother was. At the age of 14, Ruby auditioned to become an idol but was rejected with a fake phone call by Aqua, who will not allow her to follow Ai's footsteps. Thus, Ruby decides to form her own idol group under Strawberry Productions. The idol group consists of Kana Arima and MEM-cho.

Ai lived in the countryside without her father, missing from birth, and her mother, who was arrested. She grew up in an orphanage and at age 12, she was scouted by the president of Strawberry Productions, Ichigo Saitou, to become an idol. Ai did not believe she could become an idol due to not knowing love. Ichigo explains that she can lie and pretend to show love for fans. She eventually becomes the face of the idol group, B-Komachi. At age 16, Ai was pregnant with twins. She decided to keep them and hid the fact from the world to experience a family and puts her idol activities on hiatus. After the birth of twins, Aquamarine and Ruby, she returned to her idol activities. At age 20, a follower discovered the existence of her children and murders her for "betraying her fans".

Kana was considered an acting prodigy as a child known as "a genius child actor who can cry in ten seconds". Kana first met Aqua when the show she was in needed an extra and Aqua stepped in. As a teenager, the number of acting roles decreased because she would always steal the spotlight from her peers. To survive in the acting industry, Kana decided to hold back her acting talent. Kana reunited with Aqua and Ruby in high school and started developing feelings for Aqua. Still struggling to make it big in acting industry, Ruby persuades Kana to join her idol group, B-Komachi. Kana joins and becomes the lead idol for the group.

Akane is an actress that signs up for a teenage reality dating show, My Love with a Star Begins Now (LoveNow), where she meets Aqua. During the show, Akane was an overlooked character but needed to make her presence known to promote the theater she was currently working at. On an episode of LoveNow, she accidentally scratches another female character in the face. The viewers of the show lashed out and began insulting her on social media with death threats. After reading the death threats, she was going to commit suicide. Aqua stops her after getting her to calm down. Nearing the end of the show, her image clears up and Aqua kisses her during the last episode. The couple decides to stay together after the show to maintain appearances. Several months into their relationship, she figures out Aqua's plans to avenge his mother and vows to support him any way she can.

MEM-cho is a YouTube and TikTok star that signs up for LoveNow. She pursued to become an idol but could not due to her family situation. She decided to livestream and lie about her age to gain many followers. After LoveNow, Aqua recruits her to B-Komachi. She was reluctant due to her age, but ultimately decides to join.

Ichigo is the president of Strawberry Productions. He is the husband of Miyako Saitou. Ichigo was responsible for the recruitment of Ai Hoshino to the B-Komachi. He acts as the caretaker for Aqua and Ruby after Ai's death. 

Miyako is the wife of Ichigo Saitou and acts as the primary caretaker for Aqua and Ruby after Ai's death. She manages Strawberry Productions and keeps the business afloat after the disbandment of the original B-Komachi. 

Gotanda is the film director who scouted Aqua and convinced him to become an actor.

Media

Manga
Oshi no Ko, written by Aka Akasaka and illustrated by Mengo Yokoyari, has been serialized in Shueisha's seinen manga magazine Weekly Young Jump since April 23, 2020. Shueisha has collected its chapters into individual tankōbon volumes. The first volume was released on July 17, 2020. As of January 19, 2023, ten volumes have been released.

In April 2022, Shueisha began publishing the series in English on the Manga Plus website and mobile app. In July 2022, at Anime Expo, Yen Press announced that they licensed the series for an English release.

Volume list

Anime
An anime adaptation was announced in June 2022. The anime, later revealed to be a television series, will be produced by Doga Kobo and directed by Daisuke Hiramaki, with Chao Nekotomi serving as assistant director, Jin Tanaka writing the scripts, Kanna Hirayama handling the character designs, and Takurō Iga composing the music. It is set to premiere on April 12, 2023, on Tokyo MX and other networks. An extended 90-minute version of the first episode is set to be screened in advance at selected theaters in Japan on March 17 of the same year. The opening theme song is  performed by Yoasobi, while the ending theme song is  performed by Queen Bee.

At Anime NYC 2022, Sentai Filmworks announced that they licensed the series, and will be streaming it on Hidive.

Reception
By April 2021, the manga had over 1 million copies in circulation. By October 2022, it had over 3 million copies in circulation.

Oshi no Ko ranked #11 on Takarajimasha's Kono Manga ga Sugoi! list of best manga of 2021 for male readers; it ranked #7 on the 2022 list. The series ranked #4 on the "Nationwide Bookstore Employees' Recommended Comics of 2021" by the Honya Club website. The series ranked #13 on the 2021 "Book of the Year" list by Da Vinci magazine; it ranked #25 on the 2022 list. Oshi no Ko was nominated for the 14th Manga Taishō in 2021 and placed fifth with 59 points; it was nominated for the 15th edition in 2022 and placed eighth with 49 points. In August 2021, Oshi no Ko won the Next Manga Award in the print category. The manga was nominated for the 67th Shogakukan Manga Award in the general category in 2021, the 26th Tezuka Osamu Cultural Prize in 2022, and the 46th Kodansha Manga Award in the general category in 2022. The series ranked #5 on AnimeJapan's 5th "Most Wanted Anime Adaptation" poll in 2022.

References

Further reading

External links
 

 

2023 anime television series debuts
Anime series based on manga
Doga Kobo
Fiction about reincarnation
Fiction about social media
Japanese idols in anime and manga
Seinen manga
Sentai Filmworks
Shueisha manga
Tokyo MX original programming
Yen Press titles